Desmond J. McLean (20 May 1931 – 2008) was a Scottish footballer who played as a goalkeeper for Celtic, Queen's Park, Arsenal, Airdrieonians, Dundee United and Dumbarton.

McLean joined Dundee United from Airdrie on a two-month contract in August 1953. He played in the first three Scottish League Cup matches of the season before losing his place, and was released when his contract expired.

References

External links

1931 births
2008 deaths
Scottish footballers
Dumbarton F.C. players
Celtic F.C. players
Queen's Park F.C. players
Arsenal F.C. players
Airdrieonians F.C. (1878) players
Dundee United F.C. players
Scottish Football League players
Association football goalkeepers